Metombola is a minor Bantu language of Gabon.

References

Kele languages
Languages of Gabon